The Neolithic flint mines of Spiennes are among the largest and earliest Neolithic flint mines which survive in north-western Europe, located close to the Walloon village of Spiennes, southeast of Mons, Belgium. The mines were active during the mid and late Neolithic between 4,300 and 2,200 BC. Declared to be "remarkable for the diversity of technological solutions used for extraction" the site and its surroundings were inducted into the UNESCO's list of World Heritage Sites in 2000.

Description 
Discovered in 1843, the first excavations were undertaken by the mining engineer Alphonse Briart and two others during railway construction in 1867, with results presented to the International Prehistoric Congress held in Brussels in 1872. Intermittent excavations have been carried out up to the present day.

Underneath is an elaborate man-made network of caverns accessible via the many shafts.

A seminal stage of human inventiveness, technological and cultural application and progress, the transition between opencast and underground mining for flint nodules is impressively displayed and documented. Research has illustrated Neolithic techniques for the cutting of the flint and the extraction of large slabs of flint, that weighed up to hundreds of kilos. The nodules were extracted using flint picks. The stones were then knapped into rough-out shapes of axes, and finally polished to achieve the final state.
 
Polishing strengthens the final product, making the axe- or adze-head last longer. The smooth surface also aids the cutting action by lowering friction with the wood. The axes were used initially for forest clearance during the Neolithic period, and for shaping wood for structural applications, such as timber for huts and canoes.

Conservation and access 
An interpretative centre called SILEX'S opened in spring 2015. There is a museum on the surface and it is normally possible to descend into a mine.

Similar sites 
The site has been compared with Grimes Graves and Cissbury in the United Kingdom, and Krzemionki in Poland, which are also sources of flint stone. However, different hard rocks were used for the polished stone axes. There are several locations in Britain where fine-grained igneous or metamorphic rock was collected from screes or opencast mines, then roughed out locally before trading on to other parts of the country. Examples include the Langdale axe industry, Penmaenmawr and Tievebulliagh.

References 

Bibliography

 C. Guillaume, Ph. Lipinski & A. Masson: Les mines de silex néolithiques de la Meuse dans le contexte européen. Musées de la Meuse, Sampigny 1987. 
 F. Gosselin: Un site d'exploitation du silex à Spiennes (Hainaut), au lieu-dit "Petit-Spiennes". Vie archéologique 22, 1986, 33-160. 
 F. Hubert: Une minière néolithique à silex au Camp-à-Cayaux de Spiennes. Archaeologia Belgica, 210, 1978. 
 F. Hubert: L'exploitation préhistorique du silex à Spiennes. Carnets du Patrimoine n°22. Ministère de la Région wallonne, Direction générale de l'Aménagement du Territoire, du Logement et du Patrimoine, Namur 1997. 
 R. Shepherd: Prehistoric Mining and Allied Industries. (Academic Press, London 1980).
 Société de recherches préhistoriques en Hainaut: Minières néolithiques à Spiennes (Petit-Spiennes). 1997 
ICOMOS evaluation

Hélène Collet, Philippe Lavachery, Michel Woodbury, Raw material exploitation strategies on the flint mining site of Spiennes (Hainaut, Belgium), (2016)  in Journal of Lithic Studies (2016) vol. 3, nr. 2
H. Collet, A. Hauzeur & J. Lech, The prehistoric flint mining complex at Spiennes on the occasion of its discovery 140 years ago, (2008) in Flint mining in Prehistoric Europe: Interpreting the archaeological records, European Association of Archaeologists, 12th Annual Meeting, Cracow, Poland, 19–24 September 2006 (BAR International Series 1891): 41-77.
Hélène Collet, Mineurs illustres du Hainaut, (2012), in Les Cahiers nouveaux, no 83, septembre 2012, p. 21-25
 Toussaint M., Collet H., Jadin I., Lavachery P., Pirson S., Woodbury M., Durieux J., Eloy J. & Lambermont S., 2019. Recent discoveries of human skeletons in the flint mine shafts of Spiennes: casualties or burials? In: Collet H. & Hauz eur A. (eds), 2019. Mining and Quarrying. Geological Characterisation, Knapping Processes and Distribution Networks during Pre- and Protohistoric Times. Proceedings of the 7th International Conference of the UISPP Commission on Flint Mining in Pre- and Protohistoric Times, Mons and Spiennes, 28 September – 1 October 2016. Anthropologica et Praehistorica, 128. Bruxelles, SRBAP, pp. 245-262.

External links 

 Image Gallery
 Visit of the Neolithic Flint mines, Interpretive Centre "SILEX'S"
 Spiennes Neolithic flint mines, archaeological team website
 Unesco list

World Heritage Sites in Belgium
Wallonia's Major Heritage
Prehistoric mines
History of Wallonia
Prehistoric sites in Belgium
Geography of Hainaut (province)
Buildings and structures in Hainaut (province)
Archaeological sites in Belgium
Flint mining